Red oaks are tree species in the genus Quercus section Lobatae.

Red oak, Red Oak or Redoak may also refer to:

Trees
 Quercus buckleyi, Texas red oak
 Quercus falcata, southern red oak
 Quercus graciliformis, Mexican white oak, Canby oak, or Chisos oak
 Quercus rubra, the northern red oak, with a large range in southeastern and south-central Canada and the eastern and central United States
Carnarvonia araliifolia, a rainforest tree from Australia

Places
 Red Oak, Georgia, an area of Fulton County, Georgia
 Red Oak, Illinois, an unincorporated community 
 Red Oak, Iowa, a town in southwestern Iowa
 Red Oak, Bell County, Kentucky, an unincorporated community 
 Redoak, Louisiana, an unincorporated community 
 Red Oak, Michigan, an unincorporated community
 Red Oak, Missouri, an unincorporated community 
 Red Oak, North Carolina, a town
 Redoak, Ohio, an unincorporated community 
 Red Oak, Oklahoma, a town
 Red Oak, Texas, a city
 Red Oak, Virginia, an unincorporated community 
 Red Oaks Mill, New York, a hamlet and census-designated place
 Red Oak (power station), in Sayreville, New Jersey

Other uses
 Red Oak (beer), a North Carolina-based microbrewery 
 Agkistrodon contortrix, a venomous snake species found in North America
 Red Oak High School (disambiguation)

See also
 Oak red, a coloring matter formed from the oak bark tannins
 Red Oak Creek (disambiguation)